European hazard symbols for chemicals are pictograms defined by the European Union for labelling chemical packaging (for storage and workplace) and containers (for transportation). They are standardised currently by the CLP/GHS classification.

GHS hazard pictograms

The European Union CLP Regulation (for "Classification, Labelling and Packaging") was introduced as EC Regulation 1272/2008. It is based on the GHS system, to secure for "physical, health and environment hazards".

The European Agreement concerning the International Carriage of Dangerous Goods by Road (ADR) fixed harmonised pictograms for transportation. Vehicles carrying dangerous goods have to be fitted with orange signs, where the lower number identifies the substance, while the upper number is a key for the threat it may pose. See former pictograms below.

Former hazard pictograms (1999–2007)
The hazard symbols for chemicals were defined in Annex II of Directive 67/548/EEC. A consolidated list with translations into other EU languages was found in Directive 2001/59/EC (see ).

The 'n' in Harmful (Xn) stands for the French word nocif (harmful) and the Italian word nocivo (noxious).

References

External links
 
 

Pictograms
Hazard symbols
Warning systems
Lists of symbols

no:Faresymboler